Cul De Sac West was a settlement in Newfoundland and Labrador.

See also
List of ghost towns in Newfoundland and Labrador

Ghost towns in Newfoundland and Labrador